Baghak-e Shomali (also Romanized as Bāghak-e Shomālī) is a village in Baghak Rural District, in the Central District of Tangestan County, Bushehr Province, Iran. At the 2011 census, its population was 517 in 131 families.

In 2010 Baghak-e Shomali a village synthesis of villages:
Ahsham-e Khodadad (احشام خداداد) - Khodaruha (خدروها) - Ahsham-e Zar-e Mohammad (احشام زایر محمد)- Ahsham-e Mohammad Heydar (احشام محمدحیدر).
This villages at the 2006 census, its population was 534 in 123 families.

References 

Populated places in Tangestan County